Soy is a constituency in Kenya, one of six constituencies in Uasin Gishu County.

The name is derived from the Kalenjin word Soin meaning hot.

References 

Constituencies in Uasin Gishu County